Erik Bradley Imler (born June 1, 1971 in Silver Spring, Maryland) is an American soccer coach and former player. He won national championships while playing at the University of Virginia before becoming part of the US team that competed at the 1992 Summer Olympics in Barcelona. He is currently an assistant coach for Stumptown AC in the National Independent Soccer Association.

Youth and college
Imler grew up in Maryland, attending Bowie High School in Bowie, Maryland.  In 1989, his senior year, he was named a Parade Magazine high school All-American soccer player.  After high school, he attended the University of Virginia where he played as a defender and defensive midfielder on the men's soccer team from 1989 to 1992.  During his four season at Virginia, the Cavaliers took the NCAA title twice (1991 and 1992) and were co-champions once (1989).  In 1992, he was the team captain as a senior.  Imler was a two-time second-team All-American.  While at Virginia, he majored in sports medicine.  In 2000, SoccerAmerica magazine named Imler to its College Team of the Century.

Professional
In 1994, Imler played for the Delaware Wizards of USISL.  In 1995, he moved to the Raleigh Flyers.  In February 1996, D.C. United of Major League Soccer (MLS) drafted Imler in the third round (30th overall) in the 1996 MLS Inaugural Player Draft.  He spent the 1996 season in central defense with United, playing in nineteen games as the team took both the 1996 MLS Cup and 1996 U.S. Open Cup titles.  United released Imler in 1997 and he signed with the Worcester Wildfire of USISL.  At the same time, he pursued a return to MLS and had a two-week try out with the New England Revolution.  On May 7, 1997, the Revs signed Imler as a Discovery Player after impressing the coaches during his trial.   The Revs waived Imler on November 10, 1997.  In 1998, he signed with the Charleston Battery, but tore his anterior cruciate ligament during a pre-season game which led to his losing the entire 1998 season.  In 1999, Imler played one game, twelve minutes total, for the Charleston Battery.  The Battery then released him and he finished the season, and his career, with the Lehigh Valley Steam.

National and Olympic teams
Imler was a member of the U.S. team at the 1987 U-16 World Cup in Canada.  He then went on to play with the U.S. U-20 national team, but was not a member of the team at any cups.  In 1991, Imler was part of the U.S. gold winning soccer team at the Pan American Games.

He then continued to play for the U-23 national team leading up to the 1992 Summer Olympics.  Imler started all six games as the U.S. qualified for the tournament.  He was then named to the U.S. soccer team for the games.  At the Olympics, the U.S. went 1-1-1 and did not qualify for the second round.

On March 23, 1993, Imler earned his only caps with the U.S. national team in a 2-2 tie with El Salvador.  However, in the 43d minute, he tore ligaments in his right knee during the game and was replaced by Yari Allnutt who scored a goal.  Imler never appeared again for the senior national team.

Coach
Since retiring from playing professionally, Imler has held several positions as a youth soccer coach.  He was a Director of Coaching and team coach with Charlotte Soccer Academy in North Carolina.  In May 2008, Imler became the head coach of the Belmont Abbey College women's soccer coach.  He took the team to a 17-3-3 record in his only season as head coach.  He resigned on July 8, 2009.  In September 2010, Imler became an assistant coach with the United States men's national under-17 soccer. In March 2021, he joined National Independent Soccer Association side Stumptown AC as an assistant coach.

References

External links
 
 

1971 births
American soccer coaches
American soccer players
D.C. United players
Delaware Wizards players
Charleston Battery players
Footballers at the 1992 Summer Olympics
Lehigh Valley Steam players
Living people
Major League Soccer players
New England Revolution players
Olympic soccer players of the United States
Pan American Games gold medalists for the United States
Pan American Games medalists in football
Parade High School All-Americans (boys' soccer)
People from Bowie, Maryland
Soccer players from Maryland
Raleigh Flyers players
United States men's international soccer players
Virginia Cavaliers men's soccer players
Worcester Wildfire players
United States men's youth international soccer players
United States men's under-20 international soccer players
United States men's under-23 international soccer players
Association football defenders
Footballers at the 1991 Pan American Games
Medalists at the 1991 Pan American Games
Virginia Cavaliers men's soccer coaches
The Citadel Bulldogs men's soccer coaches
Belmont Abbey Crusaders
National Independent Soccer Association coaches
College women's soccer coaches in the United States